Ayanleh Souleiman (born 3 December 1992), also known as Hassan Ayanleh is a Djiboutian middle distance runner who specialises in the 1500 metres. He is the Djiboutian record holder for the distance, with his best of 3:29.58 minutes, as well as being the 3000 metres holder with 7:42.22 minutes. He also holds the indoor world record for the 1000-meter which he achieved at the 2016 Globengalan event in Stockholm Sweden. He also set a new IAAF Diamond League record at the  IAAF Diamond League in August 2016 in the men's 1000 meters

Running career
Souleiman's first international appearances came in 2009, when he placed tenth in the 1500 m at the Jeux de la Francophonie and ran in the heats of the 3000 m at the World Youth Championships.

In 2011, Souleiman won the title of 1500 m of the 2011 Pan Arab Games in Doha, in a time of 3:34.32, to win his country's first medal in this competition. He also placed sixth in the 1500 m at the 2011 All-Africa Games.

The following season saw him appear on the global scene, as he reached fifth in the final at the 2012 IAAF World Indoor Championships. His first major medal followed at the 2012 African Championships in Athletics where he claimed the silver medal in the 1500 m.

Souleiman set the Djiboutian national indoor record in the 3000 m at the Indoor Flanders Meeting in February 2013, coming third with a time of 7:39.81 minutes. In June 2013 he ran a national record at 800 m at a meet in Sweden.

Souleiman won the bronze medal at the 2013 World Championships in Athletics held in Moscow in August 2013, finishing behind Mohammed Aman of Ethiopia and Nick Symmonds of the United States.

In 2014, Souleiman also won the Bowerman Mile at the Prefontaine Classic, held at Hayward Field in Oregon with a time of 3:47:32.

Personal bests
 1000 metres (indoor) – 2:14.20 (2016) WR
 800 metres – 1:42.97 (2015) NR
 1000 metres – 2:13.49 (2016) NR
 1500 metres – 3:29.58 (2014) NR
 Mile run –	3:47.32 (2014) NR
 3000 metres − 7:42.22 (2012) NR
 1500 metres (indoor) –	3:36.13 min (2013) NR
 3000 metres (indoor) – 7:39.81 min (2013) NR

Achievements

1Did not finish in the semifinal

References

External links
 

1992 births
Living people
Djiboutian male middle-distance runners
World Athletics Championships medalists
World Athletics Championships athletes for Djibouti
Athletes (track and field) at the 2016 Summer Olympics
Olympic athletes of Djibouti
World Athletics indoor record holders
Athletes (track and field) at the 2019 African Games
People from Djibouti (city)
African Games silver medalists for Djibouti
African Games medalists in athletics (track and field)
Diamond League winners
World Athletics Indoor Championships winners
IAAF Continental Cup winners
Gadabuursi
Athletes (track and field) at the 2020 Summer Olympics